1997 JEF United Ichihara season

Competitions

Domestic results

J.League

Emperor's Cup

J.League Cup

Player statistics

 † player(s) joined the team after the opening of this season.

Transfers

In:

Out:

Transfers during the season

In
Takayuki Sugiyama
Arnold Scholten (from Ajax on July)
Yuki Abe (JEF United Ichihara youth)
Ryohei Nishiwaki (JEF United Ichihara youth)

Out
Osamu Matsumoto
Rade (to Atlético Madrid on September)

Awards
none

References
J.LEAGUE OFFICIAL GUIDE 1997, 1997 
J.LEAGUE OFFICIAL GUIDE 1998, 1996 
J.LEAGUE YEARBOOK 1999, 1999 
URAWA REDS OFFICIAL HANDBOOK 2007, 2007,

Other pages
 J. League official site
 JEF United Ichihara Chiba official web site

JEF United Ichihara
JEF United Chiba seasons